Lead Heads is an upcoming British drama film directed by Giles Borg from an screenplay by Patrick Makin. The film stars Olatunji Ayofe, Rupert Everett, Tom Felton, Derek Jacobi, Luke Newberry and Mark Williams.

Cast
 Olatunji Ayofe
 Rupert Everett
 Tom Felton
 Derek Jacobi
 Luke Newberry
 Mark Williams

Production
Principal photography began on March 25, 2021 and is expected to conclude on April 25, 2021 in London, United Kingdom.

References

External links
 

Upcoming films
British drama films